The 1925 Wake Forest Demon Deacons football team was an American football team that represented Wake Forest University as an independent during the 1925 college football season. In its third season under head coach Hank Garrity, the team compiled a 6–2–1 record and outscored opponents by a total of 185 to 40.

Schedule

References

Wake Forest
Wake Forest Demon Deacons football seasons
Wake Forest Demon Deacons football